Kadzidło  is a village in Ostrołęka County, Masovian Voivodeship, in east-central Poland. It is the seat of the gmina (administrative district) called Gmina Kadzidło.

The village has a population of 4,032.

References

External links
Official website

Villages in Ostrołęka County
Łomża Governorate
Warsaw Voivodeship (1919–1939)